The Pleichach is a river in Lower Franconia, Bavaria, Germany. Its source is near the village Hausen bei Würzburg. It passes through Oberpleichfeld, Unterpleichfeld, Rimpar and the city of Würzburg. It flows into the Main at the northern edge of the city centre of Würzburg.

See also
List of rivers of Bavaria

References

Rivers of Bavaria
Rivers of Germany